
Maracaibo Lake is a lake in the Cercado Province, Beni Department, Bolivia. At an elevation of 177 m, its surface area is 15.8 km².

Lakes of Beni Department